Qumulo is an American data storage company based in Seattle, Washington. Founded in 2012, it offers products and services to help other companies manage and curate large amounts of data.

History 
Qumulo was founded in March 2012 by Neal Fachan, Peter Godman, and Aaron Passey. They all previously worked at Isilon, a storage platform that was acquired by EMC. Several of Qumulo's key employees are also former Isilon employees.

The company received $2.3-million seed funding from investment company Valhalla Partners. In November 2012, it secured an additional $24.5 million from a Series A round led by Highland Capital Partners. By the end of its first year, the company had raised a total of $26.8 million while releasing few details about its possible product offering.

After an 18-month development period in 2013–2014, Qumulo began selling its products in August 2014. Six months after its product release, the company announced completion of a $40-million funding series led by Kleiner Perkins Caufield & Byers. Before entering the development period, Qumulo employed 18 people which increased to 90 by February 2015 and to 150 employees in January 2016.

The company remained secretive about its product offering until March 2015, when it finally offered specific details of its software, describing it as a "data aware" storage system. This was followed by a $32.5-million funding series in June 2016 adding new investor Allen & Company. However, the company's share price had dropped by more than 35% when compared to previous rounds and the funds generated were below the company's expectations.

In November 2016, Qumulo hired Bill Richter to succeed Godman as CEO. Godman continued as CTO until the end of 2018. Qumulo raised $30 million additional funds in April 2017 and $93 million in June 2018, bringing it total funding to $230 million. In January 2019, the company opened offices in Vancouver, Canada. It employs approximately 220 people as of April 2019. Citing economic conditions and getting the company to profitability, on June 29, 2022 Qumulo laid off 80 employees, approximately 19% of its workforce.

Products 
Qumulo develops storage software for file-based data. The file system software can be deployed with on-premise data centers on Qumulo's network-attached storage hardware, as well as on Hewlett Packard Enterprise Apollo and Dell PowerEdge R740xd platforms. It can also be used on the cloud storage platforms Amazon Web Services, Microsoft Azure, or Google Cloud Platform.

In September 2018, the firm announced an update to its software adding machine learning-powered pre-fetch to anticipate which files the user will most likely access next. The software preemptively caches files identified by analyzing user behavior and patterns in file access.

References

External links 

 

Data storage